This is a list of sports desegregation firsts. Within each section, the entries are in chronological order by achievement.

Major League Baseball
 1871: Steve Bellán (1849–1932), first Latin American, depending on whether or not the National Association of Professional Base Ball Players is considered a major league
 1879: William Edward White (1860–1937), believed to be the first African American to play in the major leagues, appearing in one game on June 21, 1879. White passed as white.
 1884: Moses Fleetwood Walker (1856–1924), first openly African-American player
 1887: Jim Toy (1858–1919), another possible, disputed candidate for first Native American player
 1897: Louis Sockalexis (1871–1913), a member of the Penobscot tribe, often considered the first player of Native American ancestry
 1902: Lou Castro (1876–1941), the first Latin American, if not Bellán
 1921: Moses J. Yellow Horse (1898–1964), first full-blooded Native American player, from the Pawnee tribe
 1947: Jackie Robinson (1919–1972), first African American to play in Major League Baseball in the modern era
 1947: Larry Doby (1923–2003), second African American to break the color barrier, first in the American League
 1964: Masanori Murakami (born 1944), first Japanese player

National Football League
Note: NFL.com, the official site of the league, recognizes players of the American Professional Football Association (APFA), which was renamed the National Football League (NFL) in 1921, as members of the NFL.

Players
 1920: Fritz Pollard (1894–1986), one of the first two African-American players; also the first (co-)head coach
 1920: Bobby Marshall (1880–1958), one of the first two African-American players
 1927: Lou Molinet (1904–1976), first Hispanic, Cuban and Latin American player
 1927: Sneeze Achiu (1902–1989), first player of east Asian descent

Other
 1921: Fritz Pollard: first (co-)head coach, of the Akron Pros of the APFA
 1965: Burl Toler (1928–2009), first African-American official
 1988: Johnny Grier (1947–2022), first African-American referee

National Basketball Association
 1947: Wat Misaka (1923–2019), first non-white player and first of Asian descent
 1950: Nathaniel Clifton (1922–1990), Chuck Cooper (1926–1984) and Earl Lloyd (1928–2015), the first African Americans in the NBA, with Lloyd being the first to play in a game

National Hockey League
 1926: Taffy Abel (1900–1964), first non-white and first Indigenous American (Ojibwe) player in the NHL
 1948: Larry Kwong (1923–2018), first player of Asian descent
 1953: Fred Sasakamoose (1933-2020), first Canadian First Nations player with treaty status
 1958: Willie O'Ree (born 1935), first black player
 1991: Bill Guerin (born 1970), first player of Hispanic descent

Boxing
 1902: Joe Gans (1874–1910), first African-American world champion 
 1907: Jack Johnson (1878–1946), first African-American world heavyweight champion

Tennis
 1945, 1958: Bob Ryland (1920-2020), first African-American to compete in the NCAA National Championships and first professional player
 1950: Althea Gibson (1927–2003), first African American to play in the United States National Championships (now the US Open) and first to win a Grand Slam title
 1963: Arthur Ashe (1943–1993), first African American selected to the United States Davis Cup team

Golf
 1963: Sewsunker Sewgolum (1928–1978), first person of color to win a provincial open in South Africa, the Natal Open
 1964: Althea Gibson (1927–2003), first African American to join the LPGA tour

Association football
 1881: Andrew Watson (1856–1921), considered the first black person to play association football at the international level
 1889: Arthur Wharton (1865–1930), widely considered to be the first black professional footballer in the world

Rugby union
 1871: James Robertson (c. 1854–1900), Scottish rugby union player reputed to be the first black rugby union player in the world

References

Desegregation
Sports